Maria Aparecida Souza Dias, known as Cidinha (born 6 October 1976) is a Brazilian former footballer. She scored two goals in the 1999 FIFA Women's World Cup, against Nigeria before the team was knocked out in the semi-finals.

In 1997 Cidinha played for São Paulo FC when they won the Campeonato Paulista de Futebol Feminino. She was called up to Brazil's squad for the 1999 FIFA Women's World Cup as a Palmeiras player. As a Vasco player, she was also a member of the Brazil team that participated in the 2000 Sydney Olympics and finished in fourth place.

In 2003 Cidinha retired from football, returned to her hometown, and took up employment as a yard inspector in a private school.

References

External links
 

1976 births
Living people
Brazilian women's footballers
Brazil women's international footballers
Women's association football defenders
1999 FIFA Women's World Cup players
Olympic footballers of Brazil
Footballers at the 2000 Summer Olympics
São Paulo FC (women) players
Sociedade Esportiva Palmeiras (women) players
Sportspeople from Mato Grosso do Sul
People from Campo Grande
CR Vasco da Gama (women) players